Bugyly is a range of mountains in Kazakhstan. Administratively the range is part of the Shet District, Karaganda region.

Bugyly is located near Saken Seifullin village (formerly named Zharyk). The range area is a weekend and leisure destination for Karaganda people. The Bugyly Nature Reserve is a  protected area in the Bugyly and Zhaksy Tagyly ranges.

Geography 
Bugyly is one of the subranges of the Kazakh Upland system. The mountains are of moderate height and have generally smooth, gentle slopes. River Sherubainura flows at the feet of the northeastern end of the Bugyly and some of its left tributaries originate in the range. The Zhaksy Tagyly (Жақсы Тағылы) range lies to the south of the southern end.

See also
Geography of Kazakhstan

References

External links

Karaganda Region - Kazakhstan - Welcome.kz

Kazakh Uplands
Geography of Karaganda Region